Stenobothrus rubicundulus, common name Wing-buzzing Grasshopper, is a species of short-horned grasshoppers in the family Acrididae.

Description
Body is mainly green, while abdomen and hind femurs are orange-reddish. Wings are dark brown and broadened, with harshly sclerotised veins. Males are quite good fliers. Adults can be found from July to early October feeding on grasses and herbs. These grasshoppers produce sounds by wing vibration (crepitation) and by stridulation.

Distribution
This species mainly occurs in Central Europe, especially in the Central and Southern Alps. It is present in Austria, Bosnia, Bulgaria, Croatia, France, Greece, Italy, North Macedonia, Romania, Serbia, Slovenia and Switzerland.

Habitat
These grasshoppers are a mainly montane species with a wide temperature tolerance.

References

 Fieber, 1853 : Synopsis der europaischen Orthopteren. Lotus (Prag), vol. 3.
 Lorier E, Clemente ME, García MD, Presa JJ. Acoustic behavior of Fenestra bohlsii Giglio-Tos (Orthoptera: Acrididae: Gomphocerinae) 
 Dirk Berger & Dragan P. Chobanov & Frieder Mayer  Interglacial refugia and range shifts of the alpine grasshopper Stenobothrus cotticus (Orthoptera: Acrididae: Gomphocerinae) - Org Divers Evol (2010) 10:123–133

External links
 Biolib
  Fauna Europaea
 Orthoptera species
 Pyrgus.de

rubicundulus
Orthoptera of Europe